The Convention Relating to the Distribution of Programme-Carrying Signals Transmitted by Satellite was opened for signature on 21 May 1974 in Brussels and entered into force on 25 August 1979. It is overseen by the United Nations Committee on the Peaceful Uses of Outer Space.

Provisions 
Convention provides for the obligation of each Contracting State to take adequate measures to prevent the unauthorized distribution on or from its territory of any programme-carrying signal transmitted by satellite.

Membership
As of 2014, the convention has been ratified by 37 states; there are 10 other states that have signed it but have not yet ratified it.

List of parties

See also
 List of parties to the Convention Relating to the Distribution of Programme-Carrying Signals Transmitted by Satellite

References

Copyright treaties
Intellectual property treaties
Space treaties
Treaties concluded in 1974
Treaties entered into force in 1979
1974 in Belgium
Treaties of Armenia
Treaties of Australia
Treaties of Austria
Treaties of Bahrain
Treaties of Bosnia and Herzegovina
Treaties of Chile
Treaties of Colombia
Treaties of Costa Rica
Treaties of Croatia
Treaties of El Salvador
Treaties of West Germany
Treaties of Greece
Treaties of Honduras
Treaties of Italy
Treaties of Jamaica
Treaties of Kenya
Treaties of South Korea
Treaties of North Macedonia
Treaties of Mexico
Treaties of Moldova
Treaties of Montenegro
Treaties of Morocco
Treaties of Nicaragua
Treaties of Oman
Treaties of Panama
Treaties of Peru
Treaties of Portugal
Treaties of the Soviet Union
Treaties of Rwanda
Treaties of Serbia and Montenegro
Treaties of Singapore
Treaties of Slovenia
Treaties of Switzerland
Treaties of Trinidad and Tobago
Treaties of the United States
Treaties of Vietnam
Treaties of Yugoslavia
United Nations treaties
Treaties extended to West Berlin